Brockleymoor was a hamlet in Cumbria, England, but it is now part of the village of Plumpton. It is located several miles north of Penrith, not far from the M6 motorway.

See also
List of places in Cumbria

References

Hamlets in Cumbria
Eden District